Myanmar Standard Time (MMT;), formerly Burma Standard Time (BST), is the standard time in Myanmar, 6:30 hours ahead of UTC (UTC+06:30). MMT is calculated on the basis of 97°30′E longitude. MMT is used all year round, as Myanmar does not observe daylight saving time.

History

Pre-colonial period
Myanmar did not have a standard time before the British colonial period. Each region kept its own local mean time, according to the Burmese calendar rules: sunrise, noon, sunset and midnight. The day was divided into eight 3-hour segments called baho (ဗဟို), or sixty 24-minute segments called nayi (နာရီ). Although the calendar consists of time units down to the millisecond level, the popular usage never extended beyond baho and at most nayi measurements; a gong was struck every nayi while a drum (စည်) and a large bell (ခေါင်းလောင်း) were struck to mark every baho.

Colonial period

The use of a common time began in British Burma in the late 19th century. The first confirmed mention of Rangoon Mean Time (RMT) at GMT+6:24:40 being in use was in 1892, a year before the country's first time ball observatory was opened in Rangoon (Yangon) on 1 October 1893. However, the use of RMT as the common time, at least in some sectors, most probably started earlier. (The country's first rail service, between Rangoon and Prome (Pyay), began on 2 May 1877, and the non-authoritative IANA time zone database says RMT was introduced in 1880.) On 1 July 1905, a new standard time called Burma Standard Time (BST) at GMT+6:30—set to the longitude 97° 30' E, and 5 minutes and 20 seconds ahead of RMT—was first adopted by the Railways and Telegraph administrations. Although the rest of the country came to adopt BST, RMT continued to be used in the city of Rangoon at least to 1927. By 1930, however, BST apparently had been adopted in Rangoon as well.

The standard time was changed to Japan Standard Time (JST) during the Japanese occupation of the country (1942–1945) in World War II.

After independence
The standard time was reverted to GMT+6:30 after the war. It has remained ever since, even after the country's independence in 1948. The only change has been its name in English; the official English name has been changed to Myanmar Standard Time presumably since 1989 when the country's name in English was changed from Burma to Myanmar. The country does not observe a daylight saving time.

Timeline of common times

IANA time zone database
The IANA time zone database contains one time zone named Asia/Yangon for Myanmar.

Notes

References

Bibliography
 
 
 
 
 
 
 
 
 
 
 
 
 

 
Time in Southeast Asia